Deshamanya Shivakumaran Pasupati is a leading Sri Lankan Tamil lawyer, President's Counsel, Solicitor General and Attorney General.

Early life and family
Pasupati is the son of physician V. T. Pasupati and Kamalambikai. He was educated at the Ananda College and Jaffna Hindu College. After school he joined the University of Ceylon from where he graduated with a degree in law. He then obtained Post-Graduate Diploma in International Law from the University of Cambridge.

Career
Pasupati was Director of Public Prosecutions. He was Solicitor General between 1974 and 1975. He then served as Attorney General from 1975 to 1988. Pasupati is a President's Counsel.

Pasupati was awarded the Deshamanya title, the second highest Sri Lankan national honour, in 1989.

Later life
Pasupati moved to Australia and served as a legal advisor for the rebel Liberation Tigers of Tamil Eelam. He took part in the Norwegian peace process between 2002 and 2006.

Pasupati is chairman of Australians for Human Rights of the Voiceless and president of the Tamil Senior Citizens' Association (NSW).

References

Alumni of Ananda College
Alumni of Jaffna Hindu College
Alumni of the University of Ceylon
P
Australian people of Sri Lankan Tamil descent
Deshamanya
Living people
President's Counsels (Sri Lanka)
P
Sri Lankan Tamil lawyers
Year of birth missing (living people)